Krystyna Moszumańska-Nazar (5 September 1924,Lviv, now Ukraine – 27 September 2009, Kraków) was a Polish composer, music educator and pianist. She was born in Lwów, Poland (now Lviv, Ukraine), and after World War II studied at the State Higher School of Music in Kraków with Stanisław Wiechowicz for composition and Jan Hoffman for piano. After completing her studies, she took a position as professor at the Academy of Music in Kraków and also served as Rector from 1987 to 1993. She died in Kraków after an extended illness.

Honors and awards
Winner of the Young Composers' Competition of the Polish Composers' Union (1954)
International Competition for Women Composers in Mannheim (1961, 1966)
First Prize/Gold Medal, International Competition for Women Composers in Buenos Aires (1962)
Second Prize Karol Szymanowski Composers' Competition (1974)
Award of the Polish Composers' Union
Award of the Minister of Culture and Art (five times)
Award of Merit for National Culture
Prime Minister's Award
Honoris Causa doctorate from the Music Academy in Kraków
City of Kraków Award

Works
Moszumanska-Nazar composed for orchestra, chamber ensemble, piano, vocal and electronic performance. Selected works include:
Hexahedra jor Orchestr
Suite of Polish Dances
Exodus
Music for Strings
Polish Madonnas

References

1924 births
2009 deaths
20th-century classical composers
21st-century classical composers
Polish music educators
Women classical composers
Polish classical composers
Ukrainian classical composers
Alumni of the Academy of Music in Kraków
Academic staff of the Academy of Music in Kraków
Women music educators
20th-century women composers
21st-century women composers
Polish women composers